Louise Katharina Burgaard (born 17 October 1992) is a Danish handballer for Metz Handball and the Danish national team.

She participated at the 2011 World Women's Handball Championship in Brazil, the 2012 Summer Olympics in London and the 2012 European Women's Handball Championship in Serbia.

Achievements

Domestic
Danish Championship:
Winner: 2014
Silver Medalist: 2013, 2016
Bronze Medalist: 2017
French Championship:
Winner: 2022
Silver Medalist: 2021
Danish Cup:
Winner: 2013, 2015
Finalist: 2016
French Cup:
Winner: 2022

European
EHF Cup:
Winner: 2013
EHF Cup Winners' Cup:
Winner: 2014
EHF Champions League:
Bronze medalist: 2022

Individual awards

 All-Star Right Back of the Junior World Championship: 2010
 All-Star Right Back of the Junior European Championship: 2011
All-Star Right Back of the Danish League: 2013, 2019

References

External links

1992 births
Living people
Danish female handball players
Handball players at the 2012 Summer Olympics
People from Esbjerg
Viborg HK players
Olympic handball players of Denmark
FCM Håndbold players
Expatriate handball players
Danish expatriate sportspeople in France
TTH Holstebro players
Sportspeople from the Region of Southern Denmark